Jan Vriend (born November 1938 in Benningbroek) is a Dutch classical music composer, conductor, organist and pianist. He lives in Gloucestershire, England since 1984.

Studies and career
Vriend studied at the Amsterdam Conservatory from 1960 to 1967, with Else Krijgsoman (piano), Anthon van der Horst and Jan Felderhof (music theory), and Ton de Leeuw (composition). During this period he also studied electronic music with Gottfried Michael Koenig at the University of Utrecht.

He won the Conservatoire of Amsterdam Prize for Composition (1967), the Schnittger Organ Prize (1966) for his composition Herfst (Dutch for Autumn) and the Gaudeamus International Composers Award with Huantan in 1970.

As a conductor, Vriend has directed several choirs and instrumental ensembles which perform both early and contemporary music. Perhaps the best-known of these is the ASKO Ensemble, which he founded in 1965.

Discography
 1978 - Variations on Bart Berman, piano: Vriend, Hekster, Loevendie, De Vries, Kleinbussink (Golf)
 Elements of logic, Huantan. Residence Orchestra with conductor Ernest Bour and Radio Wind Ensemble with conductor Hans Vonk
 Herostase by Harrie Starreveld, flute and Harry Sparnaay, bass clarinet (Music + Practice)
 1996 - Hallelujah II on Asko Ensemble (conductor David Porcelijn) plays Jan Vriend, Willem Boogman, Klas Torstensson (Donemus)
 1996  - Huantan on Fifty Years International Gaudeamus Music Week  (Donemus)
 2009 - ''Entre el olivo y el hombre. Du-Dich-Dir. Choir-book (part 1). Ensembles. Nederlands Kamerkoor, Klaas Stok (KTC)
2010 - Jets d'orgue for organ, recorded at Haarlem St. Bavo church by Jan Hage

References

External links
Official Website of Jan Vriend 
Extensive biography at Donemus, Amsterdam

1938 births
Living people
20th-century classical composers
21st-century classical composers
Dutch classical pianists
Dutch male classical composers
Dutch classical composers
Dutch conductors (music)
Male conductors (music)
Gaudeamus Composition Competition prize-winners
People from Noorder-Koggenland
Male classical pianists
20th-century conductors (music)
21st-century conductors (music)
21st-century classical pianists
20th-century Dutch male musicians
21st-century male musicians